Carlos Alberto de Oliveira Secretário (born 12 May 1970) is a Portuguese former professional footballer who played mainly as a right-back, currently a manager.

In a 17-year career, in which he appeared in 341 Primeira Liga games and scored 12 goals, he played for six clubs in his country including Porto, with which he won 16 major titles. He also briefly represented Real Madrid.

Secretário played more than 30 times with the Portugal national team, representing the country in two European Championships. In 2007, he started working as a coach.

Playing career

Club
After making his professional debut with Gil Vicente F.C. in the Segunda Liga, Secretário, who was born in São João da Madeira and started his career as a midfielder, moved to the Primeira Liga with F.C. Penafiel in 1989, then spent one additional season with F.C. Famalicão in the same league. Ahead of 1992–93, he signed for S.C. Braga.

In the summer of 1993, Secretário joined FC Porto, quickly establishing himself as an undisputed starter in defense or midfield – after João Pinto's retirement, he played almost exclusively as a right-back – and helping the northerners to two leagues, one Cup and one Supercup in his first spell. He attracted attention from Real Madrid, which signed the player in July 1996, but he would encounter extreme difficulties in carving a starting niche with the Spanish club, which was aggravated with the January 1997 signing of Italian Christian Panucci; in a bizarre incident in a game against Real Betis at the Santiago Bernabéu Stadium, a delay was caused by a rabbit presumably thrown into the fray from the terraces, and he was quick enough to catch it. "Secretário may or may be not a good player," said TV commentator Arsenio Iglesias at the time, "but he is indeed a great hunter."

Secretário returned to Porto in January 1998 for six-and-a-half additional seasons, and would go on to conquer the UEFA Cup and the UEFA Champions League in successive years, although he was now only backup to emergent Paulo Ferreira. On 14 March 2002, he was sent off for a professional foul on Emmanuel Olisadebe during a 2–1 continental home win over Panathinaikos FC, receiving a three-match suspension.

In June 2005, Secretário retired after one year with F.C. Maia (second tier).

International
Secretário earned 35 caps for Portugal, and played at the 1996 and 2000 European Championships. In both cases second choice, he totalled three appearances.

|}

Coaching career
In 2007, two years after retiring, Secretário started his coaching career with Portuguese fourth-tier side Maia, where he had retired as a player. He continued working in the lower leagues in the following seasons, also having a spell in French amateur football.

Secretário was appointed at Championnat National 2 club US Créteil-Lusitanos on 1 June 2018. In his first season, with a team including compatriots and their diaspora on the pitch and in the backroom, he won promotion as champions with four games remaining. He resigned in December 2020, citing health problems and the desire to retire to Portugal.

In August 2022, 52-year-old Secretário was placed in intensive care after suffering a stroke. After four months of recovery, he was next seen publicly on New Year's Day.

Honours

Player
Porto
Primeira Liga: 1994–95, 1995–96, 1997–98, 1998–99, 2002–03, 2003–04
Taça de Portugal: 1993–94, 1997–98, 1999–2000, 2000–01, 2002–03
Supertaça Cândido de Oliveira: 1993, 1994, 1998, 1999
UEFA Cup: 2002–03

Real Madrid
La Liga: 1996–97

Portugal
UEFA European Championship third place: 2000

Manager
Créteil
Championnat National 2: 2018–19

References

External links

1970 births
Living people
People from São João da Madeira
Sportspeople from Aveiro District
Portuguese footballers
Association football defenders
Primeira Liga players
Liga Portugal 2 players
Gil Vicente F.C. players
F.C. Penafiel players
F.C. Famalicão players
S.C. Braga players
FC Porto players
F.C. Maia players
La Liga players
Real Madrid CF players
UEFA Cup winning players
Portugal youth international footballers
Portugal under-21 international footballers
Portugal international footballers
UEFA Euro 1996 players
UEFA Euro 2000 players
Portuguese expatriate footballers
Expatriate footballers in Spain
Portuguese expatriate sportspeople in Spain
Portuguese football managers
F.C. Maia managers
A.D. Lousada managers
US Créteil-Lusitanos managers
Portuguese expatriate football managers
Expatriate football managers in France
Portuguese expatriate sportspeople in France